The 2015 season is Sporting Cristal's 60th season in the Peruvian First Division, and also the club's 60th consecutive season in the top-flight of Peruvian football.

Players

Competitions

Overall

Torneo Descentralizado

Torneo del Inca

Torneo Apertura

Torneo Clausura

Semi-finals

Finals

Copa Libertadores

Second Stage

References 

Sporting Cristal seasons